Theodore "Ted" Allen Welton (July 4, 1918 – Nov. 14, 2010) was an American theoretical physicist best known as the co-author of the fluctuation dissipation theorem. During 1944 and 1945 he worked at Project Y in Los Alamos, New Mexico on nuclear weapons in Richard Feynman's T-4 Group after being recruited by Feynman.

Welton was born in Saratoga Springs, New York and educated at the Massachusetts Institute of Technology, where he received a B.S. degree in 1939. He received his Ph.D. from the University of Illinois in 1944.

He worked at Los Alamos National Laboratory on diffusion problems during the Manhattan Project and was present at the Trinity Test.

After World War II he taught at MIT and the University of Pennsylvania. In 1948, he gave a simple qualitative description of the quantum electrodynamic corrections in atomic physics such as the Lamb shift as the interaction of non-relativistic treated electrons with stochastic quantum mechanical fluctuations of the electrodynamic field in the vacuum state, the mean value of which vanishes, but the standard deviation does not. In 1950 he worked at Oak Ridge National Laboratory in the Theoretical Physics Division; and in the following year, with Herbert Callen, he published the landmark fluctuation-dissipation theorem, showing that the explanations of Brownian motion and Johnson noise are specific examples of the more general theorem. Over the course of his career, Welton contributed to the development of nuclear reactors, and worked on particle physics and electron microscopy.

In 1953, he became a Fellow of the American Physical Society. He also received a Humboldt Prize for his work in physics.

He was married twice and had four children from his first marriage.

References

Further reading
 https://www.oakridger.com/article/20101123/NEWS/311239994 Obituary
 https://www.scribd.com/doc/48928105/Ted-Welton-Memories-of-Richard-Feynman Physics Today, February 2007

1918 births
2010 deaths
People from Saratoga Springs, New York
American nuclear physicists
MIT Department of Physics alumni
University of Illinois alumni
Humboldt Research Award recipients
Fellows of the American Physical Society